Rams is a 2015 Icelandic drama film written and directed by Grímur Hákonarson. It was screened in the Un Certain Regard section at the 2015 Cannes Film Festival where it won the Prix Un Certain Regard. It was screened in the Contemporary World Cinema section of the 2015 Toronto International Film Festival. It was selected as the Icelandic entry for the Best Foreign Language Film at the 88th Academy Awards but it was not nominated. In 2016, online newspaper Kjarninn voted it the second-greatest Icelandic film of all time.

Plot
Two sheep farming brothers have not spoken to each other for forty years due to differences in their personalities, complicated by one brother, Kiddi's, poor temper and alcoholism (it is implied his problems caused him to be disinherited, another source of strife between them), and the other brother, Gummi's, resentment and jealousy over Kiddi's prize-winning ram. They live in adjacent houses on the family farm, legally owned by the sober brother. Both are unmarried and attached to their flocks. A prize-winning ram belonging to Kiddi is found to have scrapie after Gummi reports its symptoms, which is then found in two other farms, necessitating the slaughter of all the sheep in the valley. The farmers must burn their hay and disinfect the barns.

Gummi kills his flock before the biohazards team arrive, but hides a few ewes and a ram in his basement, as they are the last of their breed. His brother resents Gummi for reporting the disease and the subsequent cull, inflaming tensions between them. Kiddi refuses to kill his sheep and, after authorities intervene and cull them, he becomes drunk and abusive more often. He also refuses to clean his barn; so as the legal owner, Gummi must step in and clean it—which he does while Kiddi is in hospital. Upon his return, sobered-up Kiddi accidentally discovers Gummi's hidden sheep and wants to help save them, but Gummi refuses all association. When a member of the cleanup team also discovers the sheep, the two brothers are forced to collaborate and attempt to drive them into the highlands in a blizzard. Their quad bike bogs down in a snowdrift, and the brothers become separated. The sheep wander off, and Kiddi finds Gummi in a snowdrift, near death from hypothermia. He attempts to save his brother by building a makeshift snow shelter, but Gummi does not revive. The film ends with Kiddi attempting to warm Gummi in the womb-like shelter, acknowledging their reconciliation.

Cast
 Sigurður Sigurjónsson as Gummi
 Theódór Júlíusson as Kiddi
 Charlotte Bøving as Katrin
 Jon Benonysson as Runólfur
 Gunnar Jónsson as Grímur
 Þorleifur Einarsson as Sindri
 Sveinn Ólafur Gunnarsson as Bjarni

Production
Rams was based on a story told by the director's father about two brothers sharing the same land who had a falling out over a woman and stopped speaking to each other for 40 years. Grímur liked the tragicomic underpinnings of the story, noting that such conflicts can be common in rural Iceland and beyond. "These brothers are not only in sheep farming, they are also in the parliament."

The film was shot on locations in the Bárðardalur valley in north east Iceland between Akureyri and Mývatn. 

The film was shot with anamorphic lenses to impart the feeling of a western and was partially inspired by the 2007 film There Will Be Blood, as well as the work of the Finnish filmmaker, Aki Kaurismäki. Sigurður Sigurjónsson and Theodór Júlíusson, two of Iceland's best-known actors, prepared for their roles by working on a sheep farm. Most of the other characters were actual farmers, as was the film's sheep trainer.

Reception

Rams received critical acclaim from critics. The critical consensus states: "Rams transcends its remote location—and somewhat esoteric storyline—by using the easily relatable dynamic between two stubborn brothers to speak universal truths." On Metacritic, the film has a weighted average score of 82 out of 100, based on 24 critics, indicating "universal acclaim".

Accolades
Rams won the prize for Un Certain Regard for 2015, the top prize conferred by a jury presided over by Isabella Rossellini. At the 2015 Transilvania International Film Festival, Rams won the Special Jury Award (i.e. third place) and also won the Audience Award (most votes for a film in competition). It won the Audience award at the Tromsø International Film Festival and Iranian Fajr Film Festival in 2016.

Remake
An Australian remake, directed by Jeremy Sims and starring Sam Neill and Michael Caton, was released in Australian cinemas on 29 October 2020.

See also
 List of submissions to the 88th Academy Awards for Best Foreign Language Film
 List of Icelandic submissions for the Academy Award for Best International Feature Film

References

External links
 
 
 

2015 films
2015 drama films
2010s Icelandic-language films
Icelandic drama films
Danish drama films
Norwegian drama films
Polish drama films
Films about infectious diseases
Films about families
Films about farmers 
Films about sheep
Films set on farms
Films set in Iceland
Films shot in Iceland
Films scored by Atli Örvarsson
Tragicomedy films
Films directed by Grímur Hákonarson